Michael Reschke (born 29 September 1957) is a German director of football. He was head of sport of VfB Stuttgart from 2017 to 2019.

Reschke started his career as youth coach of Viktoria Frechen and moved to Bayer 04 Leverkusen in 1979. In 1986 he coached the under-19 team of Leverkusen to win the German Championship. Reschke replaced Reiner Calmund as managing director of Bayer 04 Leverkusen in 2004. In the summer of 2014 he became technical director of FC Bayern Munich.

Reschke moved to VfB Stuttgart in August 2017. He officially took over his new office as head of sport and sporting director in Stuttgart on 11 August 2017. On 12 February 2019, he was relieved of his duties.

References

1957 births
Living people
Bayer 04 Leverkusen non-playing staff
FC Bayern Munich non-playing staff
VfB Stuttgart non-playing staff
German football chairmen and investors